Yuetang Subdistrict is a subdistrict of Hetang District in Zhuzhou, Hunan, China. The town has a village and 7 communities under its jurisdiction. Its seat is at Wenhua Road

History
The subdistrict of Yuetang was formed in 1969, it was originally a subdistrict of East District in Zhuzhou. Through the district adjustment of Zhuzhou in 1997, the East District was dissolved, the subdistrict was transferred to Yuetang District formed in the year.

The Hetang District adjusted its administrative divisions in 2001, the subdistrict of Yuetang had 9 communities under its jurisdiction in 2004. Hetangpu Village was merged to the subdistrict from Jinshan Subdistrict in 2017.

Subdivisions

a village
 Hetangpu Village

7 villages
 Donghuan Community
 Nanyueling Community
 Shitangchong Community
 Shizitou Community
 Shuizhu Community
 Yeyachong Community
 Yuanjiawan Community

References

Hetang District
Towns of Hunan